Bridge Street may refer to:

Streets
 A street in the television soap opera EastEnders
 Bridge Street, in Walford, London, England
 Bridge Street, Aberdeen, Scotland; see Union Terrace, Aberdeen
 Bridge Street, Banbury, England; see Hunt Edmunds
 Bridge Street, Cambridge, England
 Bridge Street, Dublin, Ireland; see Streets and squares in Dublin
 Bridge Street, London, England; see Parliamentary Estate
 Bridge Street (Manhattan), New York City, U.S.
 Bridge Street, Montreal, Quebec, Canada; see Carleton Place
 Bridge Street, Nelson, New Zealand
 Bridge Street, Manotick, Ontario, Canada
 Bridge Street, Penang, Malaysia; 
 Bridge Street, Philadelphia, U.S.; see Bridesburg station
 Bridge Street, Reading, England
 Bridge Street, Sydney, New South Wales, Australia
 Bridge Street, Warrington, Warrington, England
Bridge Street (Yarmouth, Maine), U.S.

Railway stations
Northampton Bridge Street railway station
Thrapston Bridge Street railway station
Bridge Street subway station on the Glasgow Subway

Other uses
 Bridge Street, Suffolk, England, a hamlet
 Bridge Street Town Centre, Huntsville, Alabama, USA, a shopping mall

See also 
 Bridges Street, a street in Hong Kong
 Bridge Street Bridge (disambiguation)

Odonyms referring to a building